The triangle (Heterogenea asella) is a species of moth of the family Limacodidae. It is found in most of the Palearctic realm.
The wingspan is 15–20 mm. Adults are on wing from the end of May to mid July in one generation per year.

The larvae feed on Acer, Corylus, Fagus and Quercus species. They are grub-like and have very short legs and a retracted head. Larvae can be found from August to May. The last instar larva overwinters in a cocoon resembling a gall.

References

External links

Fauna Europaea
Lepiforum.de

Limacodidae
Moths of Japan
Moths of Europe
Taxa named by Michael Denis
Taxa named by Ignaz Schiffermüller